Mohammad Ghoreishi (born February 13, 1995) is an Iranian footballer who plays as a defender for Iranian club Sanat Naft in the Persian Gulf Pro League.

Club career

Sanat Naft
On 21 September 2018, he made his debut for Sanat Naft Abadan in a controversial match against Paykan that awarded 0 - 3 for Paykan by IFF decision.

Club career statistics

References

Living people
1995 births
Association football defenders
Iranian footballers
Sanat Naft Abadan F.C. players
Zob Ahan Esfahan F.C. players
Persian Gulf Pro League players
People from Babol
Sportspeople from Mazandaran province